Matthiessen State Park is an Illinois state park located a few miles south of the more famous Starved Rock State Park. The main entrances to both parks are located on Illinois State Route 178.

History

The park is near Oglesby, in LaSalle County, Illinois, United States. Two mansions, several cottages, a garage, and a private fire station were built here by Matthiessen for his family. It was an estate that hosted a private park known as "Deer Park". The park was donated to Illinois by Matthiessen's heirs, following his death in 1918, and was renamed in his honor in 1943. The last building of the former estate was destroyed in 1981, although some of the concrete stairs leading into the canyon are of the original construction.

Geology 
The park is centered on a stream that flows from Matthiessen Lake to the Vermilion River.  The stream has eroded partway through the sandstone layers, leaving interesting rock formations and drops. The Upper Dells begin at Matthiessen Lake with the Lake Falls, which drop into the canyon below, and continue downstream to the  Cascade Falls where the Lower Dells begin. The interesting coloration of many of the canyons is the result of minerals in the groundwater. Many mineral springs exist throughout the park, providing salt lick spots for the large deer population.

Flora and fauna

Flora
The cool and damp canyons provide an ideal habitat for many species of mosses, liverworts, and ferns. On top of the bluffs that form the canyons can be found black oak (Quercus velutina), red cedar (Juniperus virginiana), and white oak (Quercus alba) trees, which thrive in the sandy soil. The park contains several species generally found farther north, such as the Canada yew (Taxus canadensis) and Canada mayflower (Maianthemum canadense).

Fauna
Frogs, toads, and salamanders live on the canyon floors, while bird species such as the cliff swallow nest in the eroded canyon walls. As the former name of "Deer Park" might suggest, the area is home to a very large population of white-tail deer.

Recreation
Today there are five miles of marked hiking trails, in addition to nine miles of mountain biking and equestrian trails. The Plum Island Eagle Sanctuary is located nearby.

References

State parks of Illinois
Protected areas of LaSalle County, Illinois
Protected areas established in 1943
1943 establishments in Illinois